Ben Lilley (11 February 1894 – 4 August 1950) was an English first-class cricketer active from 1921 to 1937, who played for Nottinghamshire. He was born in Kimberley, Nottinghamshire and died in Nottingham. He played in 373 first-class matches as a right-handed batsman, scoring 10,496 runs with a highest score of 124, one of seven first-class centuries; and as a wicketkeeper, holding 657 catches and completing 133 stumpings.

References

English cricketers
Nottinghamshire cricketers
North v South cricketers
Non-international England cricketers
English cricketers of 1919 to 1945
People from Kimberley, Nottinghamshire
Cricketers from Nottinghamshire
1894 births
1950 deaths